The 5th Alberta Legislative Assembly was in session from February 2, 1922, to May 25, 1926, with the membership of the assembly determined by the results of the 1921 Alberta general election held on July 18, 1921. The Legislature officially resumed on February 2, 1922, and continued until the sixth session was prorogued on May 22, 1926 and dissolved on May 25, 1926, prior to the 1926 Alberta general election.

Alberta's fifth government was controlled by the majority United Farmers of Alberta led by Premier Herbert Greenfield, who would resign following a push from the party on November 23, 1925, and was replaced by John Edward Brownlee. The Official Opposition was the Alberta Liberal Party led by John Robert Boyle, and later Charles Richmond Mitchell, and eventually future Lieutenant Governor of Alberta John C. Bowen. The Speaker was Oran McPherson.

Speaker
Premier Herbert Greenfield nominated the government's preferred candidate for speaker, Oran McPherson, only to have one of his UFA backbenchers, Alex Moore, nominate Independent Conservative John Smith Stewart; Stewart spared the government embarrassment by declining the nomination.

Bills

Wheat Board
The Legislature would pass An Act to Confer Certain Powers upon the Canadian Wheat Board (Bill 1) during the short second session in August 1922. The bill conferred powers to the create the Alberta Wheat Pool.

Debt Adjustment Act
The Debt Adjustment Act (Bill 49) of 1923 was designed to adjust farmers' debts to a level that they could actually pay, thus allowing them to carry on while still ensuring that creditors received as much as was feasible.  In the words of University of Calgary professor David C. Jones, the bill offered "solace, but no real satisfaction". According to Jones, Greenfield's attempts to rescue southern Alberta from agricultural calamity were probably doomed to failure.  Even so, Greenfield had called the situation his top priority, and his failure to bring it to a successful resolution cost him politically.

Government Liquor Control Act of Alberta
The Government Liquor Control Act of Alberta (Bill 14) passed in the fourth session in 1924. The bill repealed prohibition which had been instituted following a 1916 referendum. The Government held a referendum on the matter in autumn 1923 which saw Albertans vote decisively for the repeal of prohibition. Bill 14 would be subject to a free vote in the legislature, and while the legislation passed, the new measures were divisive, pitting community leaders who wanted their towns to remain "dry" against those who wanted to apply for liquor licences, and different would-be saloon-keepers against one another in competing for the government-issued licences.

Membership in the 5th Alberta Legislature

Standings changes since the 5th general election

 Exact date the Speaker received resignation unknown, nomination deadline date for the 1925 federal election used. All were received by Speaker Oran McPherson after September 29 and before October 17.

References

Works Cited

Further reading

External links
Alberta Legislative Assembly Website
Legislative Assembly of Alberta Members Book
By-elections 1905 to present

05
1922 in Alberta
1923 in Alberta
1924 in Alberta
1925 in Alberta
1926 in Alberta
1922 in Canadian politics
1923 in Canadian politics
1924 in Canadian politics
1925 in Canadian politics
1926 in Canadian politics